Western Dental & Orthodontics (commonly known as Western Dental) is a chain of dental offices based in Orange, California, United States. It was founded in 1903 in Los Angeles. Western Dental has almost 250 offices in California, Arizona, Nevada, and Texas, making it one of the largest dental service providers in the United States. Up to 70% of its California patients are covered under the state's Denti-Cal health insurance program for low-income families.

In 1997 the Los Angeles Times reported on "recent accusations by state regulators" that Western Dental was providing “shoddy, dangerous” medical care to patients, as well as accusations that the company was operating a "low-quality dental mill" in which dentists were encouraged to over-treat patients to maximize profits.   Later in the article the Times added that Western "has a decade-long history of run-ins with regulators over its medical care.".  A 2010 article by local news channel ABC13 describes "lifetime injuries" patients experienced at Western Dental, with one woman left with a severed nerve after having a tooth pulled.  Two other patients cited in the article had all their teeth pulled and replaced with dentures by Western Dental, only to be told later by another dentist that their teeth had actually been healthy and did not need to be pulled.  The article also notes Western Dental was forced to pay a $1.2 million fine in 1996, with the California Department of Corporations accusing Western Dental of "consistent disregard for quality of care and patient health".

References

External links
 

Dental companies of the United States
Companies based in Orange, California
1903 establishments in California
American companies established in 1903

Companies established in 1903